Kuhbanan County is in Kerman province, Iran. The capital of the county is the city of Kuhbanan. At the 2006 census, the county's population was 24,465 in 6,348 households. The following census in 2011 counted 21,721 people in 6,271 households, by which time Shaab Jereh Rural District had been separated from the county to join Zarand County. At the 2016 census, the county's population was 21,205 in 6,413 households.

Administrative divisions

The population history and structural changes of Kuhbanan County's administrative divisions over three consecutive censuses are shown in the following table. The latest census shows two districts, three rural districts, and two cities.

References

 

Counties of Kerman Province